Nantois is a commune in the Meuse department in Grand Est in north-eastern France. It is 21 km from Bar-le-Duc, the department capital.

Notable people

Ernest Bradfer (1833–1882), iron master and politician born in Nantois

See also
Communes of the Meuse department

References

Communes of Meuse (department)